Sunanda Sharma (born 22 October 1969) is an Indian classical singer. She performs across multiple genres and styles – khyal, thumri, dadra, chaitis, and kajris.

Early life 
Sunanda was born in a musical family in Dah a small village of Distt Kangra, Himachal Pradesh, India. Her father, Pandit Sudarshan Sharma, who was an Indian classical violinist, inspired her to learn Indian classical music.

As a teenager, Sunanda lived in Himachal Pradesh, and after finishing school, attended Punjab University, Chandigarh.

Training 
Sunanda began training on the veena with her father Pandit Sudarshan Sharma at the age of four and began performances from the age of nine. She was identified as a promising artist by Padam Vibhushan Dr. Girija Devi Ji, during her performance in Jalandhar (Punjab, India) at Hariballabh Sangeet Sammela, and under her tutelage she enriched her skills by learning vocal nuances from eminent legends like Pandit Kishan Maharaj and Ustad Bismillah Khan in a Guru-Shishya Parampara style.

Career 
Over the span of her musical career, Sunanda has frequently been invited to perform for benefit concerts around the world.

India 

 Thumri Festival, New Delhi and Mumbai
 Tansen Sangeet Sammelan, Gwalior
 Sangeet Natak Academy Concerts, Allahabad and Lucknow
 Concert at Prayag Sangeet Samiti, Allahabad
 Concert at Pracheen Kala Kendra, Chandigarh
 Pancham Nishad concert, Mumbai
 Concert "Musical Journey from India to Norway", New Delhi
 Morning ragas concert, Sangeet Natak Academy, New Delhi
 Kumbh Mela, Prayagraj (2019)
 Raymond MTV "Music Summit", Jaipur (2019)
 Concert at Stein Auditorium, India Habitat Centre, New Delhi (2019)
 Concert of Music and Kathak Dance with Padma Shri Shovana Narayan (2019)
 Basant Concert at Lady Shri Ram College Alumni (ELSA), Delhi (2020)
 Concert at National Centre for Performing Arts (NCPA), Mumbai (2020)

International 

 World Voice Festival, Düsseldorf, Germany (2002)
 Annual Asian Music Circuit summer Concerts, U.K. (2000–2019)
 Concerts at Thetre Da La Ville, Paris, France (2015) (2019)
 Concerts at Cadogan Hall, London (2017) (2018)
 Concert at Fondazione Giorgio Cini, Italy (2018)
 Concert at Norwegian Parliament in Norway (2019)
 Concert at Festival of India, South Africa (2019)
 Concert at Fondazione Giorgio Cini, Venice Italy (2020)

Solo albums 
Her first solo album "Dharohar" released in 2000 by Time Music, later on, "Swar Sanchay" released in 2003 by Virgin Records, and "Sur Ganga" released in 2014 by Times Music.

References 

1969 births
Living people
Indian classical singers